Arculf (later 7th century) was a Frankish bishop who toured the Levant in around 680. Bede claimed he was a bishop. According to Bede's history of the Church in England (V, 15), Arculf was shipwrecked on the shore of Iona, Scotland on his return from a pilgrimage to the Holy Land. He was hospitably received by Adomnán, the abbot of the island monastery from 679 to 704, to whom he gave a detailed narrative of his travels. Adomnán, with aid from some further sources, was able to produce De Locis Sanctis ("Concerning the sacred places"), a descriptive work in three books dealing with Jerusalem, Bethlehem, and other places in Palestine, and briefly with Alexandria and Constantinople. Bede learned of this and spoke about him in his Ecclesiastical History of the English People. Many details about Arculf's journeys can be inferred from this text.

Modern references
Arculf appears briefly as a character in the novel Justinian by H. N. Turteltaub (Harry Turtledove).

See also
Chronological list of early Christian geographers and pilgrims to the Holy Land who wrote about their travels, and other related works
Late Roman and Byzantine period
Eusebius of Caesarea (260/65–339/40), Church historian and geographer of the Holy Land
Anonimous "Pilgrim of Bordeaux", pilgrim to the Holy Land (333-4) who left travel descriptions
Egeria, pilgrim to the Holy Land (c. 381-384) who left a detailed travel account
St Jerome (Hieronymus; fl. 386-420), translator of the Bible, brought an important contribution to the topography of the Holy Land
Madaba Map, mosaic map of the Holy Land from the second half of the 6th century
Anonimous Pilgrim from Piacenza, pilgrim to the Holy Land (570s) who left travel descriptions
Early Muslim period
Paschal Chronicle, 7th-century Greek Christian chronicle of the world
Medieval period
John of Würzburg, pilgrim to the Holy Land (1160s) who left travel descriptions

External links
Catholic Encyclopedia: Arculf
De locis sanctis  (English; J. R. Macpherson translation, 1895)

Further reading
 Meehan, D (ed.) Adomnan's 'De Locis Sanctis''' (Dublin, 1958).
 Woods, D. ‘Arculf's Luggage: The Sources for Adomnán's De Locis Sanctis’, Ériu'' 52 (2002), 25-52.

7th-century Frankish bishops
7th-century Frankish writers
Roman Catholic monks
Holy Land during Byzantine rule
Holy Land travellers